Nédélec is a French surname of Breton origin.

It may refer to:

Florent Nédélec, French architect
Michel Nédélec (1940-2009), French cyclist
Raymonde Nédélec (1915-2016), French politician
Jean-Marie Nédélec (1834-1896), French missionary and namesake of the Canadian municipality of Nédélec